Lars Olai Meling (1876–1951) was the Norwegian Minister of Trade 1924–1926 and 1933–1935.

References

1876 births
1951 deaths
Ministers of Trade and Shipping of Norway